The 2004 Hel van het Mergelland was the 31st edition of the Volta Limburg Classic cycle race and was held on 3 April 2004. The race started and finished in Eijsden. The race was won by Allan Johansen.

General classification

References

2004
2004 in road cycling
2004 in Dutch sport